Norah Lyle-Smyth (22 March 1874 – 1963) was a British suffragette, photographer and socialist activist.

Life
Smyth was born into a wealthy family, and was the niece of the composer and suffragette Ethel Smyth.  Until his death in 1912 her father controlled many aspects of her life, refusing her permission to attend university or marry her cousin, as she had hoped.  Instead, she devoted her time to private study, the arts, and village life.

In 1912, Smyth joined the Pioneer Players, Edith Craig's feminist theatre company.  Also around this time, she joined the Women's Social and Political Union (WSPU), working as an unpaid chauffeur for Emmeline Pankhurst, and undertaking various other tasks for the WSPU headquarters.  However, her greatest interest was in promoting the cause of working women, and this led her to join Sylvia Pankhurst's East London Federation of Suffragettes.  

In 1912 she was involved in an arson attack on the country home of the vehemently anti women's suffrage politician Lewis Harcourt. She managed to escape capture and go abroad, and only confided the story to her nephew many years later. She claimed the attack was on an empty part of the house to minimise risk to life and the art works it contained. 

In early 1914, the group formed a "People's Army", which Smyth led.  It undertook a parade in Ford Road, but Smyth was arrested for assault, and the idea was dropped.

In 1914, Sylvia was called to Paris to discuss the future of her East London Federation with Christabel Pankhurst, leader of the WSPU.  Smyth accompanied Sylvia, making travel arrangements and organising disguises, in order that Sylvia could avoid arrest on public order charges.  Sylvia and Christabel agreed a clean split between their groups.

Smyth remained active in the East London group and when, in 1916, it became the Women's Suffrage Federation (WSF), she was chosen as its treasurer.  Although generally seen as a loyal supporter of Sylvia Pankhurst, Smyth was sometimes able to change her opinion; for example, she strongly advised her to remain active in the Women's International League for Peace and Freedom when Sylvia had been planning to resign.  She was also concerned, in her role as treasurer, that as Sylvia became more outspoken against World War I and, later, in support of communism, that it was discouraging donations to the WSF.  When the WSF set up a toy factory, Smyth was a strong supporter, and when in 1920 the factory was in financial difficulties, Smyth sold personal items to bail it out.

The WSF also became involved in the Labour Party, and Smyth was elected to the Poplar Trades Council and Labour Party in 1919, alongside Melvina Walker and L. Watts.  However, when the three appeared at a Labour Party meeting arguing in support of Bolshevism, they were expelled.

The WSF became the core of the Communist Party (British Section of the Third International) and when the editor of its newspaper, the Workers' Dreadnought, was imprisoned, Smyth alternated as acting editor with Jack O'Sullivan.  For many years, Smyth had used her photography skills to provide pictures for the newspaper of East End life, particularly of women and children living in poverty.

After a period in the Communist Party of Great Britain, Smyth followed Sylvia Pankhurst into a new, left communist, organisation, the Communist Workers' Party.  She was one of the leading speakers for the new party, alongside Pankhurst and A. Kingman.  The party soon dissolved, and Smyth later moved to Florence, where she had family, and worked as a secretary.  She continued to correspond with Pankhurst until her death.

In November 2018 an exhibition of her hitherto unseen photographs held by the Institute of Social History in Amsterdam , opened in London's Four Corners gallery.

References

1874 births
1963 deaths
British feminists
English suffragettes
English communists
Photographers from London
Socialist feminists
Left communists
Members of the Workers' Socialist Federation